Ashley Caldwell (born September 14, 1993) is an American freestyle skier who has competed in aerials since 2008. Caldwell was named to the US team for the 2010 Winter Olympics in January 2010 after competing in the sport for only two seasons. The youngest in the event, she reached the finals of the Aerials. Caldwell won her first World Cup aerials event in the United States in Lake Placid, New York in January 2011, becoming the youngest freestyle female ever to win.

Caldwell then suffered back-to-back ACL tears, missing the 2012 and 2013 competitive seasons. Upon returning, she claimed the silver medal at her first world cup event in China, earning a spot to the 2014 Winter Olympics in Sochi, Russia. She placed 10th place after a bad landing on her first finals jump. She competed again in Beijing in December 2014, winning gold, alongside her 19-year-old teammate Kiley McKinnon, who won silver. She became the first female skier to land a quadruple twisting triple back flip at the 2017 World Championship in Sierra Nevada, Spain. Caldwell won the event alongside teammate Jonathon Lillis.

In the 2022 Beijing Winter Olympics, as part of Team USA, she won a gold medal in the mixed team aerials with a combined final team score of 338.34.

Personal life
Caldwell is the oldest of four children. She grew up in Northern Virginia, competing in gymnastics and other various sports as a child. She trained at Apex Gymnastics in Leesburg, Virginia. Originally living in Ashburn, Virginia and moving to western Loudoun County, Virginia, she went to Blue Ridge Middle School. Her family now resides in Houston, Texas, and she lived in Hamilton, Virginia, and then in Park City, Utah, beginning around 2013.

References

External links

1993 births
Living people
American female freestyle skiers
Freestyle skiers at the 2010 Winter Olympics
Freestyle skiers at the 2014 Winter Olympics
Freestyle skiers at the 2018 Winter Olympics
Freestyle skiers at the 2022 Winter Olympics
Olympic gold medalists for the United States in freestyle skiing
Medalists at the 2022 Winter Olympics
Sportspeople from Virginia
People from Ashburn, Virginia
People from Park City, Utah
People from Hamilton, Virginia
21st-century American women